Screaming Yellow Zonkers was a popcorn snack food, produced and marketed by Lincoln Snacks in the USA from 1968 to 2007, with subsequent limited editions. Zonkers were noted for the bold graphics and funny text of their packaging.

Development
In 1968 Lincoln Snacks developed a nut-free, kosher sugar glazed popcorn with a strong yellow color—as a variant of their other popcorn products, Fiddle Faddle and Poppycock.

When Lincoln executives invited major ad agencies in Chicago to pitch ideas for a name and marketing concept, a small agency, Hurvis, Binzer & Churchill won the account, naming the product "Screaming Yellow Zonkers" and presenting it in a black box with bold graphics, detailed illustrations and funny text.

Packaging
From the inception, part of the value of the snack was the entertainment provided on its packaging. The box text was written by Allan Katz and Howie Kraków who wrote the copy for the first several boxes, and crafted the TV and radio campaigns. The graphics were designed by Rollin Binzer, co-owner and creative director of HBC. 

Text might describe how to wash or mate Zonkers. The bottom of the box might explain how to determine if it were indeed the bottom: "Open the top, and turn the box upside down. If the Zonkers fall out, this is the bottom. If they fall up, this is the top. If nothing happens, this box is empty." Other text might suggest that 8 oz. (226 g) =  of a metric ton.

Text, graphics and illustrations varied over a series of 'editions', and noted illustrators were invited to design the packaging, within the established framework. Airbrush artist Charlie White illustrated the front of the 'circus' box along with Seymour Chwast's work. White also illustrated a giant Zonkers circus poster, with text by Katz; the poster was offered on the 'circus' box for $2.95 including shipping and handling. The circus box was subsequently displayed in the Louvre in Paris.

Discontinued
Zonkers were discontinued when Conagra acquired Lincoln Foods in 2007. Conagra reintroduced Zonkers on a limited edition basis for Walgreens, as of 2012.

See also

 Crunch 'n Munch
 Fiddle Faddle
 List of brand name snack foods
 List of popcorn brands
 Lolly Gobble Bliss Bombs
 Poppycock

References

Brand name snack foods
Discontinued products
Popcorn brands
Products introduced in 1968
Products and services discontinued in 2007